Limekiln is an unincorporated community in Berks County, Pennsylvania, United States. Limekiln is located at the intersection of Oley Turnpike Road and Limekiln Road on the border of Exeter and Oley townships.

References

Unincorporated communities in Berks County, Pennsylvania
Unincorporated communities in Pennsylvania